Akın Eldes (born 11 November 1962) is a Turkish guitarist.

Career and Life 
He was born in Frankfurt, Germany, and played mandolin and flute as a child. Eldes started playing the guitar in high school. He played with the bands E-5, Painted Bird, Asım Can Gündüz, singer-songwriter Bülent Ortaçgil, bassist Gürol Ağırbaş, composer Melih Kibar and Çapkınlar among others prior to joining Bulutsuzluk Özlemi.  He is currently playing with the Turkish rock band Pinhani. Eldes uses a variety of special hand-made guitars by Murat Sezen. He generally plays the Yamaha Pacifica PAC1511MS or Steinberger Headless guitar in Pinhani Concerts. His work with Bulutsuzluk Özlemi has been between 1986–2000.

Albums
Kafi (2002)
Türlü (2004)
Cango (2007)
Ara Taksim (2009)
Başka Türlü (2010)
Hane-i Akustik (2011)
Tek Başına (2018)
Denemeler (2021)

Singles
 Hep Birlikte (2019) KERRAR feat.Gönül Taner
 Hep Birlikte - Rerecording (2020)
 Kuzgun (2020)
 Deneme 1-2 (2020)
 Deneme 3-4 (2020)
 Deneme 5 (2020)
 Deneme 6 (2020)
 Deneme 7 - Kimlederdensin Kimlerlesin (2021)
 Deneme 8 - Oyun Havası (Karışık Tarz) (2021)
 Böyle (2021)
 Uzun İnce Bir Yoldayım (2021)
 Krähe - Kuzgun Pt.2 (2021)

Other album appearances
 Bulutsuzluk Özlemi: Uçtu Uçtu, Güneşimden Kaç, Yaşamaya Mecbursun, Yol
 Bülent Ortaçgil: Bu Şarkılar Adam Olmaz.
 Gürol Ağırbaş: Bas Şarkıları II
 Barış Manço: Mançoloji
 Melih Kibar: Yadigar
 Mehmet Güreli
 Meltem Taşkıran
 Haluk Levent: Kral Çıplak
 Pinhani: İnandığın Masallar, Zaman Beklemez Başka Şeyler
 Tanju Duru: Duru Zamanlar
 Mustafa Gökdeniz: Yalan Söyle

References

External links
 Official Spotify

Living people
Turkish rock guitarists
German people of Turkish descent
1962 births